John Hyman may refer to:

 John Adams Hyman (1840–1891), a Republican congressman in the U.S.
 John Wigginton Hyman (1899–1977), American jazz cornet player, better known as Johnny Wiggs
 John Hyman (philosopher) (born 1960), British philosopher